Muriel Stott (1889–1985) was probably the first woman with her own architectural firm in Australia, opening it in 1917. Between 1916 and 1930, she designed houses in Victoria and the surrounding area. Her most noted design is a house built for the Moran family in 1926 called "Little Milton".

Biography
Muriel Millicent Stott was born in 1889 in Melbourne, Victoria, Australia to Annie (née Twyford) and Leonard Sydney Stott She began her training at the firm of Fisher and Bradshaw and completed her articles (certification requirements) in 1916. She spent the following year in the employ of J. J. Meagher, during which time she built 2 to 3 commissions of her own. One was a brick house on High Street in East Malvern and another brick home in Malvern. In 1917 she renovated a house in Malvern and designed a timber bungalow located in Castlemaine. In 1917, she opened her own practice, probably becoming the first woman with her own architectural firm in Australia.

Stott was hired in 1918 to design a timber residence in Olinda on Coonara Street called Rainbow End. The house was built for friends of her family, the Morans, who would later have her build her most noted commission. In 1919 after finishing Rainbow End, Stott built a brick home in Hawthorn. In 1920, she made a trip with her father to the United States and upon their return, built a home in 1921 at the corner of High Street and Malvern Road in East Malvern.

In 1923, Stott registered as an architect and in 1926 built another dwelling for the Moran family. The house, known as Little Milton is on Albany Road in Toorak. She built the property in conjunction with Stephenson & Turner and when completed, the home was featured in Australian Home Beautiful. The house was modelled after an English manor house called Great Milton in Oxfordshire. The 1925 design, features a two-story brick façade topped with a pitched gable roof tiled in terra cotta. The entryway is accessed through a Tudor arch, leading into a grand hallway with parquet flooring. The lower floor has a large living room, dining room, galley kitchen and billiard room and the upper floor contains five bedrooms and baths. The gardens were designed by landscape architect Edna Walling and the grounds contain both a swimming pool and a tennis court. On 20 August 1998 the property was listed in the Victorian Heritage Register.

Little Milton may have been her last commission, as though still advertising as an architect, Stott neither joined the Victorian Institute of Architects nor had commissions which have been identified after 1926. In 1931, she went to Europe and met Desmond Leech, whom she married in 1932. Leech was a mining engineer from Johannesburg, South Africa and in 1933 she moved with him there. She designed her home at 39 Currie Street, Oaklands, Johannesburg, which was her last known design. Leech died in 1946 and Stott subsequently married James Davies, an Englishman, in 1955. She died in South Africa in 1985.

References 

1889 births
1985 deaths
Australian women architects
20th-century Australian architects
Architects from Melbourne
20th-century Australian women
19th-century Australian women